Thomas Paul Hewlett (born 17 October 2001) is an English footballer who plays as a forward for Hednesford Town on loan from Burton Albion.

Career
Hewlett signed his first professional contract with Burton Albion in June 2020. He made his senior debut for the club on 8 September 2020 as a substitute in a 3–3 EFL Trophy draw with Peterborough United, in which Burton lost on penalties.

On 3 August 2022, Hewlett joined Northern Premier League Premier Division club Belper Town on a short-term loan. On 25 November 2022, Hewlett joined Hednesford Town on a one-month loan deal.

Career statistics

Club

References

External links
Tom Hewlett at My Football Database

2001 births
Living people
English footballers
Association football forwards
Burton Albion F.C. players
Belper Town F.C. players
Leamington F.C. players
Hednesford Town F.C. players
Northern Football League players
National League (English football) players
Southern Football League players